John Maxwell (1879–1940) was a British film producer. Maxwell was the co-owner of British International Pictures, which emerged as the largest British studio following the Film Act of 1927. Maxwell was a Scottish lawyer who first came into contact with the film industry in 1912. In 1927 he took over the newly constructed British National  Studios in Elstree after its founders ran into financial problems. Maxwell built a vertically integrated company incorporating film production, film distribution, initially through Wardour Films, and a large network of cinemas (ABC Cinemas) that enabled the company to compete with the leading German and Hollywood firms. Along with the facilities in Elstree, the company also acquired Welwyn Studios in Welwyn Garden City.

With BIP (which was renamed Associated British Picture Corporation in 1933) John Maxwell began a major production programme. Maxwell imported top filmmakers from Europe as well as signing up leading British talent such as Alfred Hitchcock. Under Maxwell's leadership BIP produced several masterpieces of late silent cinema. With Hitchcock's Blackmail (1929) the company successfully made the transition to sound. While it continued to make some more expensive films, it increasingly relied on large numbers of medium or low-budget comedies and musicals aimed at the British rather than the international market.

By the mid-1930s BIP had been overtaken by its rival Gaumont British as the largest British producer. Maxwell bought a stake in Gaumont, intending this as a first step to a takeover that would allow him to merge the two companies to create a giant firm. However, he discovered that he had acquired non-voting shares, which brought him no actual control over the company. He took legal action and a court case followed.

Maxwell died in 1940. A giant British studio, similar to that envisaged by Maxwell, was created soon afterwards as J. Arthur Rank's Rank Organisation.

Selected filmography
 The Manxman (1929)
 Elstree Calling (1930)
 The Middle Watch (1930)
 Hobson's Choice (1931)
The Woman Between (1931)
 Out of the Blue (1931)
 Potiphar's Wife (1931)
 Josser in the Army (1932)
 Lucky Girl (1932)
 Facing the Music (1933)
 The Song You Gave Me (1933)
 Heads We Go (1933)
 Letting in the Sunshine (1933)

References

Bibliography
Low, Rachael. Filmmaking in 1930s Britain. George Allen & Unwin, 1985.
Richards, Jeffrey. The Age of the Dream Palace: Cinema and Society in 1930s Britain. I.B. Tauris, 2010.
 Warren, Patricia. Elstree Studios: The British Hollywood. Columbus Books, 1988.

External links

1879 births
1940 deaths
Film people from Glasgow
British film producers
British film production company founders